Grotto is a small unincorporated community in King County, Washington, United States.  It is located on U.S. Highway 2 west of Stevens Pass in the Cascade Mountains, near the town of Skykomish.  Grotto is known for its scenic mountain environment.

A post office called Grotto was established in 1910. The community was named for gorges near the original town site.

References

Unincorporated communities in King County, Washington
Unincorporated communities in Washington (state)